Cheongnyangni-dong is a neighbourhood, dong of Dongdaemun-gu in Seoul, South Korea.

At this dong, there are many convenient buildings like many kinds of financial companies and banks, a branch of Lotte Department Store, and Cheongnyangni Station. From Cheongnyangni Station, Mugunghwa-ho trains depart for Chuncheon from 06:15 to 22:20 and for Wonju, Jecheon, Taebaek, Gangneung, Yeongju, and Andong from 7:00 to 22:40 every hour except 22:00.

There are many kinds of medical hospitals and clinics. Especially, Saint Paul's Hospital of Catholic University of Korea is the largest hospital in Cheongnyangni-dong. In this hospital, there are many treatment rooms in which treats many kinds of diseases, operating theatres and wards.

See also 
Cheongnyangni Station
Cheongnyangni 588
Administrative divisions of South Korea

References

External links
Dongdaemun-gu map

Neighbourhoods of Dongdaemun District